Trnávka is a village and municipality located in the Trebišov District of the Košice Region of Slovakia.

History
In historical records the village was first mentioned in 1259.

Geography
The village lies at an altitude of 192 metres and covers an area of 6.018 km².
It has a population of about 162 people.

External links
http://www.statistics.sk/mosmis/eng/run.html

Villages and municipalities in Trebišov District